Poison Pen is a 2014 Irish comedy feature film based on a screenplay by author Eoin Colfer, directed by Steven Benedict, Lorna Fitzsimons and Jennifer Shortall.

Synopsis
P.C. Molloy (Lochlann Ó Mearáin), a Booker Prize–winning author, is coerced into writing for a tabloid gossip magazine. Cultures clash and sparks fly as the cerebral Molloy finds himself immersed in the world of vain celebrities and he begins to fall for his boss (Aoibhinn McGinnity). Poison Pen asks questions about the nature of celebrity, integrity and deception.

Cast

 Lochlann Ó Mearáin as PC Molloy
 Aoibhinn McGinnity as April
 Paul Ronan as Darcy
 Aaron Heffernan as Kurt
 Susan Loughnane as Shona
 Lauryn Canny as Sally
 Mary Murray as Dora
 Gemma-Leah Devereux as Eva
 Ryan O'Shaughnessy as Piers
 Sophie Vavasseur as Jessica
 Lyn Larkin as Julie
 Siobhan Bolton as Popstar

Reception 
The film received mixed reviews, the Chicago Reader described it as "formulaic" whereas The Hollywood Reporter described it as "crafty entertainment". Diarmaid Blehein of Film Ireland considered it a " ... quirky comedy that sucks us in to the grizzly world of magazine journalism, while at the same time entertains us immensely."

References

External links
 

2014 films
2014 comedy films
Irish comedy films
2010s English-language films